Grass Lake National Wildlife Refuge (formerly Halfbreed Lake National Wildlife Refuge) is in the central section of the U.S. state of Montana and is an integral part of the Charles M. Russell National Wildlife Refuge Complex, managed from the Charles M. Russell National Wildlife Refuge. This refuge provides nesting habitat for migratory bird species.

References

External links
 Grass Lake National Wildlife Refuge

National Wildlife Refuges in Montana
Protected areas of Stillwater County, Montana